Simon Francis Pauxtis (July 20, 1885 – March 13, 1961) was an American professional baseball player and college football coach. He also served in the Electoral College for the 1916 Presidential Election for the state of Pennsylvania.

Playing career

Penn
Pauxtis played college baseball as a catcher while studying law at the University of Pennsylvania. He was noted not only for his defensive play but also for his batting skills.  Pauxtis also was an All-American football player at Penn.

Cincinnati Reds

Pauxtis still in law school at Penn when he was signed with the Cincinnati Reds in 1909 as a new recruit to help pick up the slack in the team left by injuries of team players Tom Clarke and Frank Roth.  He played for the Reds for the 1909 season playing his first official game on September 18 and his last game on October 5.  Pauxtis officially played for four games.

Coaching career

Pennsylvania Military
Pauxtis coached football at the Pennsylvania Military College (PMC)—now known as Widener University—in Chester, Pennsylvania. He coached two distinct periods, from 1916 to 1929, and again from 1939 to 1946. At PMC, his teams had a record of 82–74–8 including a 9–1 season in 1925 with victories over Temple and Rutgers.

Dickinson
Pauxtis was the 12th head football coach at Dickinson College in Carlisle, Pennsylvania and he held that position for two seasons, from 1911 until 1912.  His coaching record at Dickinson was 8–6–2.  While at Dickinson, he struck up a friendship with Pop Warner who was coaching at Carlisle Indian School at the time.

References

External links
 
 

1885 births
1961 deaths
American football ends
Major League Baseball catchers
Cincinnati Reds players
Dickinson Red Devils football coaches
Penn Quakers baseball players
Penn Quakers football players
Widener Pride football coaches
Widener Pride men's basketball coaches
Altoona Mountaineers players
Syracuse Stars (minor league baseball) players
People from Pittston, Pennsylvania
Coaches of American football from Pennsylvania
Players of American football from Pennsylvania
Baseball players from Pennsylvania